Margaret Glaspy is an American singer and songwriter based in New York City. She began playing and living in New York at 21 years old and is currently signed with ATO Records. Her debut full length album Emotions and Math was self produced and critically acclaimed while her subsequent records have followed suit from her EP Born Yesterday to her second full length Devotion.

Early life and education
Glaspy was born in Sacramento on January 22, 1989, and grew up in Red Bluff, California. She took up the fiddle in third grade and began playing guitar and trombone in high school. At sixteen, she decided to focus exclusively on the guitar. She later received an educational grant and attended the Berklee College of Music in Boston. She was only able to afford to attend college for one semester, but continued to sneak into workshops and masterclasses on the campus. Glaspy eventually dropped out of college and began performing around Boston.

Career

Glaspy began her solo career by releasing an EP in July 2012 titled Homeschool. She signed to ATO Records in 2015 and in January 2016, released a 7-inch EP, which included "You and I" and "Somebody to Anybody". These songs were later included on the 2016 album, Emotions and Math.

Early in 2019 Glaspy played on a North American tour with Neko Case and Kimya Dawson.

Glaspy released her second full-length album on March 27, 2020, titled Devotion.

Discography

Solo
Homeschool EP (2012 self-Released)
If & When EP (2013 self-Released)
You and I b/w Somebody to Anybody 7-inch (2016 ATO Records)
Emotions and Math (2016 ATO Records)
Born Yesterday EP (2018 ATO Records)
Devotion (2020 ATO Records)

With The Fundies
The Fundies EP (2012 self-Released)

Collaborations
Jayme Stone's Lomax Project (2015 Borealis)

References

External links

  Margaret Glaspy
 
 

American women singer-songwriters
American bluegrass musicians
Living people
1989 births
Musicians from Sacramento, California
People from Red Bluff, California
Singer-songwriters from California
21st-century American singers
21st-century American women singers
Country musicians from California
The Fundies members
ATO Records artists